Seonamhaeicola maritimus is a Gram-negative, facultatively anaerobic, rod-shaped and non-motile bacterium from the genus of Seonamhaeicola which has been isolated from marine sediments from the coast of Weihai.

References

Flavobacteria
Bacteria described in 2020